Fernando García (born July 4, 1930 in Santiago, Chile) is a Chilean composer. Active since 1956 he has done orchestral music, chamber music, etc. He studied with Juan Orrego-Salas and Gustavo Becerra-Schmidt, among others. His style is strongly influenced by serialism and aleatoric procedures. He also played a role in the beginnings of electroacoustic music in Chile, after a trip he made to France in the early 1950s where he heard musique concrete. 

He worked for the Instituto de Extensión Musical of the University of Chile, and in 1962 he premiered his most important piece, the cantata América Insurrecta, which won an award at the Chilean Music Festival.

After the Chilean coup-d'état, he was forced into exile, first in Perú (1973-1979), and then in Cuba (1979-1990). He returned to his country in 1989 and joined the Faculty of Arts of the University of Chile where he taught musicology until 2009. 

In 2002, he received the National Prize for Musical Arts. And in 2013 was recognized by the Sociedad Chilena del Derecho de Autor (SCD) as one of the Fundamental figures of Chilean music.

Selected works 

Variaciones for orchestra, 1959
Sinfonía, 1960
América Insurrecta, for speaker, chorus and orchestra, text by Pablo Neruda, 1962
Quimera, theater piece after Federico García Lorca, 1965
La arena traicionada (11 de marzo de 1966), 1967
Firmamento sumergido, 1968
Las raíces de la ira (En recuerdo de Víctor Jara), 1976
Meditaciones, 1977
Temblor de cielo, 1979
Despertar de octubre (1917-1967), 1981
Puntos cardinales for strings, 1984
El reposo del guerrero, 1989
Navegaciones for flute, harp and strings, 1990
Crónicas americanas, 1992
Se unen la tierra y el hombre for tape (voice of Pablo Neruda) and orchestra, 1992
Zonas eriales for clarinet and chamber orchestra, 1995
Tres miradas for strings, 1996
Dos paisajes urbanos, 1997
Misterios, 1998
Tres cantos materiales for cello and strings, 1999
Díptico sinfónico, 1999
Rincones sordos for strings, 2001
Nacerá la aurora (Hommage to Charles Ives), 2001
Dura elegía (En recuerdo de Jorge Peña), 2002
Dos temas de discusión for strings, 2003
Luces y sombras, 2003
Juegos for percussion and strings, 2003
Nuevos juegos for percussion and strings, 2003
Obertura concertante for percussion and orchestra, 2005
Homenaje a Celso Garrido Lecca, for orchestra, 2005Implicaciones sonoras, for orchestra, 2005Imágenes siderales, 2006Signos de otoño, for string orchestra, 2011Tinieblas y Destellos, for string quartet, 2012De Norte a Sur, for drum kit and orchestra, 2013Detenidos Desaparecidos, for orchestra, 2014Sinergia'', for orchestra, 2015

References 

Chilean composers
Chilean male composers
Musicians from Santiago
1930 births
Living people